Education in Eritrea is officially compulsory between 7 and 16 years of age. Important goals of Eritrea's educational policy are to provide basic education in each of Eritrea's mother tongues as well as to produce a society that is equipped with the necessary skills to function with a culture of self-reliance in the modern economy. The education infrastructure is currently inadequate to meet these needs.

History

Initially there were only a few religious schools in Eritrea, but with the Italian governments were started the first school systems in Eritrea mainly during the late 1930s (when was established the Eritrea Governorate). In 1940 Dr. Vincenzo Di Meglio promoted the creation of the "School of Medicine" in Asmara (the first university institution in Eritrea, located initially in the Liceo Martini), under the direction of Prof. Ferro Luzzi.

After WW2 the first university in Asmara was created. This university was founded in 1958, albeit by a different name as the Collegio Cattolico della Santa Famiglia while ruled by the Italian religious organization called 'Piae Madres Nigritiae' ("Comboni Sisters"): successively, in 1964 the university had been renamed as "University of Asmara".

In the 1990s the independent Eritrea started a program to bring literacy to all children in Eritrea. Since then the school system has reached nearly 90% of young Eritreans.

A Human Rights Watch report in August 2019 suggested that the final year secondary school students are forced into compulsory military training at the Sawa military camp, where they are subjected to systematic abuse, including torture, harsh working conditions and paid insufficiently. The military personnel control the students with physical punishment, military-style discipline, and forced labour.

Levels education

There are five levels of education in Eritrea, pre-primary, primary, middle, secondary and tertiary. There are nearly 238,000 students in the primary, middle, and secondary levels of education. There are approximately 824 schools in Eritrea and two universities, University of Asmara (UoA) and the Eritrea Institute of Technology (EIT), as well as several smaller colleges and technical schools.

Current centers of tertiary education in Eritrea include, the College of Marine Biology, the College of Agriculture, the College of Arts and Social Sciences, the College of Business and Economics, the College of Nursing and Health Technology, as well as Eritrea Institute of Technology and the UoA.There are some big primary and middle schools like Mai-Tesfa, Awet and Model

The education system in Eritrea is also designed to promote private sector schooling, equal access for all groups (i.e. prevent gender discrimination, prevent ethnic discrimination, prevent class discrimination, etc.) and promote continuing education through formal and informal systems.

Barriers to education in Eritrea include traditional taboos, school fees (for registration and materials), and the cost barriers of low-income households.

Statistics

Statistics suggest that between 39 and 57 percent of school-aged children attend primary school and 21 percent attend secondary school. Student-teacher ratios are high: 45 to 1 at the elementary level and 54 to 1 at the secondary level. There are an average 63 students per classroom at the elementary level and 97 per classroom at the secondary level. Learning hours at school are often less than four hours per day. Skill shortages are present at all levels of the education system, and funding for and access to education vary significantly by gender (with dropout rates much higher for girls) and location. 

The overall literacy rate in Eritrea is estimated to be about 84 percent in 2020. In the age 15–24 the literacy rate is 89 percent.  "The Ministry [of Education] plans to establish a university in every region in the future."

References

External links
 Colonial School system in Eritrea, by Silvia Nocchi (in Italian)